The 1836 United States presidential election in Tennessee took place between November 3 and December 7, 1836, as part of the 1836 United States presidential election. Voters chose 15 representatives, or electors to the Electoral College, who voted for President and Vice President.

Tennessee voted for Whig candidate Hugh White, a Senator for Tennessee, over Democratic candidate Martin Van Buren. White won Tennessee by a margin of 15.84%.

Results

References

Tennessee
1836
1836 Tennessee elections